Ricardo César Andreu (July 27, 1919 – May 1, 2012) was an Argentine actor, comedian and musician.

He was born in a family of actors. His parents were Antonio Andreu and Isabel Anchart, who were owners of an itinerary theatre company that made tours through the Argentine provinces. When he was 12 years old the tango singer José Razzano, brought him to the Broadway theatre where he met Carlos Gardel.

Selected filmography
 Lucrezia Borgia (1947)
 Rhythm, Salt and Pepper (1951)
The Squeezing Hand (1953)
 The Phantom of the Operetta (1955)

References

External links
 

1919 births
2012 deaths
Argentine male film actors
Argentine male stage actors
Argentine male television actors
Argentine male comedians
Male actors from Buenos Aires
Burials at La Chacarita Cemetery
20th-century Argentine male actors
People from Buenos Aires